Red Cloak is an industrial area of Stonehaven, Aberdeenshire, Scotland. The site's settlement history is associated with events at the nearby Chapel of St. Mary and St. Nathalan. In current times Red Cloak is primarily an industrial dominated land use that includes Aberdeenshire Council recycling and refuse disposal functions. Earliest area prehistory is evidenced by Bronze Age finds at Fetteresso Castle and Ury House.

See also
Ury House
Muchalls Castle
Raedykes

References

Stonehaven